Michael MacWhite (1883 – 1958) was an Irish diplomat. He was born in Reenogreena, near Glandore,  County Cork in 1883. Amongst other postings, he served as the first Irish permanent delegate to the League of Nations.

Early career
MacWhite worked as a teacher in Denmark and as a newspaper correspondent. He also fought for Bulgaria in the first Balkan War. He then joined the French Foreign Legion and fought in France, Greece and Turkey. He was wounded at Gallipoli and was awarded the Croix de Guerre three times for bravery in combat. He returned to Dublin after the Great War and offered his services to the fledgling Dáil Éireann.

League of Nations
In 1921, MacWhite was sent to Geneva as Dáil Éireann representative at the establishment of the League of Nations. He reported to George Gavan Duffy. This was the start of a diplomatic career which was to take him all over the world during 30 years of service to the Irish State. MacWhite was closely involved in preparing the Irish Free State for membership of the League of Nations. Having an office at 7, Place Claparède in Geneva, he served as the communication link between the League and the nascent State. He was a strong proponent of Irish membership of the League and served as a member of the Irish delegation representing the Irish Free State at the time it applied to join the League of Nations in 1923. Following Irish admission to the League of Nations in 1923, MacWhite was appointed permanent delegate of the Irish Free State to the League. He also handled the registration of the Anglo Irish Treaty with the League, a step objected to by the UK.

Other postings
In 1929, MacWhite was sent to the United States as official representative of the Irish Free State. In 1938 he was posted to Rome where, as a representative of the renamed Irish state, Ireland, he encountered the hostility of a Fascist government distrustful of foreign diplomats. When World War II broke out, MacWhite was responsible for looking after the Irish citizens living in Rome. He retired in 1950 with the rank of Ambassador.

Personal life
He married and fathered children, including Eoin MacWhite. Eoin MacWhite was born on the same day that the Irish Free State's application for League of Nations membership was approved. His birth coincided with a tragic event for the MacWhite family. On the very day he was born, his infant sister died suddenly. Each member of the Irish delegation attended the infant's funeral in Geneva. Michael MacWhite died in 1958.

References

External links
 

Irish diplomats
Soldiers of the French Foreign Legion
1958 deaths
1883 births